In Good Company is a 2004 American romantic comedy drama film, written and directed by Paul Weitz, and starring Dennis Quaid, Topher Grace, and Scarlett Johansson.

The film is set around a middle-aged advertising executive whose company is bought out by a large international corporation leaving him with a new boss who is nearly half his age. His life is further complicated when his boss takes a romantic interest in his daughter. It received positive reviews from critics and grossed $61 million worldwide.

Plot
Dan Foreman is a 51-year-old advertising executive and head of sales for Sports America, a major sports magazine. Happily married with two daughters, Dan faces a life-changing event when his magazine is bought out by Globecom, an international corporation that promotes the corporate concept of "synergy".

After Dan is forced to fire several of his longtime colleagues, he is demoted and becomes the "wingman" of his new boss, Carter Duryea, a 26-year-old business school prodigy. While Dan develops clients through handshake deals and relationships, Carter champions the corporate creed of synergy, cross-promoting the magazine with the cell phone division and "Krispity Krunch", a snack food also owned by Globecom.

Dan and Carter are both facing challenges in their personal lives. Dan is supporting two daughters—16-year-old Jana and 18-year-old Alex who is preparing to enter college—and learns that his wife is pregnant with their third child.

Meanwhile, Carter is dumped by his adulterous, narcissistic wife of seven months and focuses all of his energy on work. With Dan facing the financial realities of taking out a second mortgage to cover his daughter's college education costs and a new child, and with Carter needing Dan's practical, real-life experience in the field of advertising, the two form an uneasy friendship.

Carter, who has been struggling with loneliness following the breakup of his marriage, invites himself to dinner at Dan's, where he meets his daughter Alex, and there is an immediate attraction. Their initial friendship allows Carter to forget his loneliness, and Alex, now attending NYU, is able to escape her own loneliness and boredom. In the coming days, Carter and Alex become romantically involved. Fearful of offending her father, they keep their relationship a secret.

Their friendship, however, takes a turn for the worse when Dan discovers that Carter and Alex have been seeing each other. He approaches them in a restaurant, and punches his boss in the face. The confrontation with her father convinces Alex to break up with Carter who is heartbroken. Soon after, Globecom CEO Teddy K visits the sales office and during a grand speech to all the employees on synergy and other similar corporate business strategies, he is questioned by Dan and shrugs him off.

Carter's boss, Mark Steckle, tells Carter to fire Dan. He refuses, claiming that losing Dan will cost them a major advertising contract. Steckle gives them 24 hours to seal the contract or be fired. As Dan has developed a long-term relationship with the client, Carter gives way to Dan's personal approach. The strategy works, and they conclude a deal.

Following another corporate shakeup, Sports America is sold off, Carter is let go, and Dan returns to his former position as head of sales. Having developed fatherly feelings toward Carter, Dan offers him a position in his new department as his "wingman", but he declines, saying he needs to take some time and discover what he really wants to do in his life.

On his way out of the building, Carter runs into Alex, and they exchange pleasantries. Dan's wife gives birth to a girl. He calls Carter in Los Angeles (who is jogging outdoors for the first time and feels like a new man) with the news.

Cast

Reception
In Good Company received mostly positive reviews and has a rating of 83% on Rotten Tomatoes based on 169 reviews with an average score of 7.05/10. The consensus states "The witty and charming In Good Company offers laughs at the expense of corporate culture." The film also has a score of 66 out of 100 on Metacritic based on 40 reviews. Audiences polled by CinemaScore gave the film an average grade of "B+" on an A+ to F scale.

TV series
On October 14, 2014 (on the film's 10th Anniversary), Universal Television hired Josh Bycel and Jon Fenner from Happy Endings to develop a TV show based on the film for CBS.

References

External links
 
 
 
 
 

2004 romantic comedy-drama films
2004 films
American business films
American romantic comedy-drama films
Films about advertising
Films about businesspeople
Films directed by Paul Weitz
Films set in New York City
Universal Pictures films
Films shot in Los Angeles
Films shot in New York City
Films scored by Stephen Trask
Films with screenplays by Paul Weitz
2000s English-language films
2000s American films